Douglaston Park is a public park located in the Douglaston section of Queens, New York City. It contains a golf course named Douglaston Park Golf Course.

According to The New York Times it is also the name of the surrounding residential area, one of five other distinct subsections of Douglaston. More specifically, the Douglaston Park neighborhood is the area located between Northern Boulevard and Interstate 495 (I-495, also known as the Long Island Expressway/LIE).

Douglaston Park Golf Course
The country club's clubhouse, known as Douglaston Manor, is an elaborate Spanish/Mission revival structure, designed by architect Clifford C. Wendehack. The front entrance and sole parking lot at the club is available at the north end of Commonwealth Boulevard and the intersection with Marathon Parkway. It is the former location of the North Hills Country Club.

References

External links
 Official NYC Parks Page
 Douglaston Park Golf Course

1927 establishments in New York (state)
Douglaston–Little Neck, Queens
Golf clubs and courses in New York (state)
Parks in Queens, New York